Sablons-sur-Huisne (literally Sablons on Huisne) is a commune in the Canton of Bretoncelles, in the Arrondissement of Mortagne-au-Perche, in the  department of Orne, northwestern France. It was established on 1 January 2016 by the merger of the former communes of Condeau, Condé-sur-Huisne (the seat) and Coulonges-les-Sablons.

See also 
 Communes of the Orne department

References 

Communes of Orne
Populated places established in 2016
2016 establishments in France
Perche